The Sierra Leone national football team represents Sierra Leone in men's international association football and it is governed by the Sierra Leone Football Association. The team's nickname is Leone Stars. The team is affiliated to the West African Football Union. The team have never qualified for the FIFA World Cup; however, they have qualified for Africa Cup of Nations thrice. The team represents both FIFA and Confederation of African Football (CAF).

History
Sierra Leone's first match was at home on 10 August 1949 against another British colony, Nigeria, and was lost 2–0. In 1954 they played another British colony and British administered U.N trust territory, Gold Coast and Trans-Volta Togoland (now Ghana), and lost 2–0 away. On 22 April 1961, they again hosted Nigeria and lost 4–2. On 12 November 1966, they hosted Liberia in their first match against a non-British colony and earned their first draw, 1–1. A week later, they lost 2–0 in Liberia. On 13 January 1971, Sierra Leone played their first match against a non-African team, West Germany's B-team. The match in Sierra Leone was won 1–0 by the Germans. Sierra Leone's first match outside Africa was also their first against an Asian nation, China. They lost 4–1 in China on 5 April 1974.

Sierra Leone's golden period was during the 1990s, qualifying for both the 1994 and 1996 Africa Cup of Nations. However, they were forced to withdraw from the next two editions due to the Sierra Leone Civil War.

In August 2014, the Sierra Leone FA cancelled all football matches in an effort to stop the spread of the 2014 Ebola virus epidemic in Sierra Leone, a week after the Liberian FA did the same. Sierra Leonean players playing outside Sierra Leone, such as Michael Lahoud playing in the United States, were discriminated against, with opposition players refusing to swap shirts, shake hands and allow them to certain places of the stadium just because they fear that they could be carrying the disease. The Sierra Leonean national team wasn't allowed to play home games and all players had to be foreign-based.
In October 2015, Sierra Leone suffered a surprise defeat to Chad in the 2018 FIFA World Cup qualifiers, with their home game having to be played in Nigeria. One year later, Sierra Leone very nearly qualified for the 2017 Africa Cup of Nations, finishing just one point behind Group I winners Ivory Coast.

On 5 October 2018, the Sierra Leone Football Association was suspended by FIFA and the Leone Stars were excluded from the 2019 Africa Cup of Nations qualification.

Recent results and fixtures

2022

2023

Coaching history

 Burkhard Pape (1966–1968)
 Klaus Ebbighausen (1976–1978)
 Warwick Rimmer (1979)
 Christian Cole (1989)
 Christian Cole (1991)
 Raymond Zarpanelian (1993–1994)
 Roger Palmgren (1996)
 John Sherington (1996–1997)
 Abdulai Sesay (1997–2000)
 Dušan Drašković (2000)
 Christian Cole (2001)
 José Antonio Nogueira (2003)
 John Sherington (2003–2006)
 James Peters (2006–2007)
 Mohamed Kanu (2007–2009)
 Daniel Koroma (2009–2010)
 Christian Cole (2010–2011)
 Lars-Olof Mattsson (2011–2013)
 Johnathan McKinstry (2013–2014)
 Atto Mensah (2014)
 John Ajina Sesay (2014–2015)
 John Sherington (2015)
 Sellas Tetteh (2015–2017)
 John Keister (2017–2019)
 Sellas Tetteh (2019–2020)
 John Keister (2020–present)

Players

Current squad
The following players were called up for the 2023 Africa Cup of Nations qualification matches against São Tomé and Príncipe on 22 and 26 March 2023.

Caps and goals are correct as of 27 September 2022, after the match against .

Recent call-ups
The following players have also been called up to the Sierra Leone squad within the last twelve months.

Notes
INJ Player withdrew from the current squad due to injury.
PRE Preliminary squad / standby
RET Player had announced retirement from international football.
SUS Player is serving a suspension.
PRI Player absent due to private circumstances.
WD Withdrawn.

Records

Players in bold are still active with Sierra Leone.

Most capped players

Top goalscorers

Competitive record

FIFA World Cup

Africa Cup of Nations

Coaching staff

References

Sources
https://web.archive.org/web/20160305221855/http://www.footballsierraleone.net/sierra-leone-to-host-the-elephants-of-ivory-coast-in-abidjan/
https://web.archive.org/web/20160405190623/http://www.footballsierraleone.net/sierra-leone-1-malawi-1-international-friendly/

External links

Football Sierra Leone official site
Sierra Leone Football Association
Sierra Leone at FIFA.com
Sierra Leone at National-Football-Teams.com

 
African national association football teams